Sottrum is a Samtgemeinde ("collective municipality") in the district of Rotenburg, in Lower Saxony, Germany. Its seat is in the village Sottrum.

The Samtgemeinde Sottrum consists of the following municipalities:
 Ahausen 
 Bötersen 
 Hassendorf 
 Hellwege 
 Horstedt 
 Reeßum 
 Sottrum

Samtgemeinden in Lower Saxony